was a province of Japan, which today comprises Shiga Prefecture. It was one of the provinces that made up the Tōsandō circuit. Under the Engishiki classification system, Ōmi was ranked as one of the 13 "great countries" (大国) in terms of importance, and one of the "near countries" (近国) in terms of distance from the capital. 

Ōmi bordered on Wakasa and Echizen Provinces to the north, Mino and Ise Provinces to the east, Iga and Yamato Provinces to the south, and Yamashiro and Tanba Provinces to the west. Lake Biwa, Japan's largest lake, is located at the center of the province.

History
The area of Ōmi has been settled since at least the Yayoi period, and the traces of several large settlements have been found. During the Kofun period, the area appears to have been dominated by several powerful immigrant clans, most notably the Wani clan, originally from Baekje. The names of "Ōmi" or "Lake Biwa" do not appear in the Kojiki, Man'yōshū or other ancient documents. Ōmi was originally called by various names. Wooden tags from the ruins of Asuka-kyō state "Ahaumi" (淡海), or variations therefore, including "Chikaumi" (近淡海), meaning "fresh-water sea or "nearby freshwater sea", which evolved into or Ōmi-no-umi, (近江海). The name was only fixed to  "Ōmi" after the enactment and enforcement of the Taiho Code in 701 AD and the decree of 713 AD that the names of the provinces as defined under the Ritsuryō system should be named using two auspicious kanji.

The Ōmi Ōtsu Palace, located in what is now the city of Ōtsu, and later the Shigaraki Palace in the city of  Kōka were briefly the capitals of Japan, and Ōmi was the location of several battles of the Asuka period Jinshin War. During the Nara period, the provincial capital and provincial temple were built in Ōtsu near the ruins of the former Ōmi Ōtsu Palace. Takebe taisha was designated as the chief Shinto shrine (ichinomiya) for the province. During the Heian period, then proximity of Ōmi to the capital at Heian-kyō, its location on the Tōkaidō and Nakasendō highways connecting the capital with the provinces of eastern Japan, and the main route from the capital to the Sea of Japan gave the province great strategic importance. With the spread of Buddhism in Japan, the great Tendai monastery of Enryaku-ji was constructed at Mount Hiei in Ōmi.

From the late Heian period and into the Kamakura period, the Sasaki clan controlled the post of shugo of Ōmi Province, and their cadet houses of the Rokkaku clan and Kyōgoku clan continued to dominate the province into the Muromachi period. In the Sengoku period, internal struggles weakened both clans, and Ōmi became a battleground between the Azai and Asakura clans in the north, and the invading forces of Oda Nobunaga from the east. Nobunaga emerged victorious, and built Azuchi Castle near Lake Biwa in Ōmi, from which he planned to eventually rule all of Japan and beyond. Following Nobunaga's assassination, much of the province was awarded by Toyotomi Hideyoshi to Ishida Mitsunari, Tokugawa Ieyasu's opponent at the Battle of Sekigahara.

After the establishment of the Tokugawa Shogunate, much of the province was divided into several feudal domains, then largest of which was Hikone Domain, ruled by the Ii clan. The southern part of the province was the home of the famous Kōga ninja, one of the two main founding schools of ninjutsu. Ōmi continued in its role as a transportation conduit, with five stations of the Tōkaidō and eight stations of the Nakasendō.

Following the Meiji restoration, on November 22, 1871 Ōtsu Prefecture and Nagahama Prefecture were created from former tenryō and hatamoto territories within the province, and each of the former domains formed its own prefecture. These were merged on January 19, 1872 to form Shiga Prefecture. From August 21, 1876 to February 7, 1881 the Reinan region of Fukui Prefecture (west of Tsuruga city) was part of Shiga Prefecture, thus giving it a shoreline on the Sea of Japan. The merger was strongly opposed by the local inhabitants, and the merger was withdrawn.

Historical districts

Ōmi was divided into 12 Districts (郡), which were further subdivided into 93 counties (郷), containing 1,597 villages. The total assessed value of the province in terms of kokudaka was 858,618 koku.

 Azai District (浅井郡)
 Higashiazai District (東浅井郡) – dissolved
 Nishiazai District (西浅井郡) – merged into Ika District on April 1, 1897
 Echi District (愛知郡)
 Gamō District (蒲生郡)
 Ika District (伊香郡) – absorbed Nishiazai District on April 1, 1897; now dissolved
 Inukami District (犬上郡)
 Kanzaki District (神崎郡) – dissolved
 Kōka District (甲賀郡) – dissolved
 Kurita District (栗太郡) – dissolved
 Sakata District (坂田郡) – dissolved
 Shiga District (滋賀郡) – dissolved
 Takashima District (高島郡) – dissolved
 Yasu District (野洲郡) – dissolved

Edo-period Domains

Notes

References
 Nussbaum, Louis-Frédéric and Käthe Roth. (2005).  Japan encyclopedia. Cambridge: Harvard University Press. ; OCLC 58053128
 Titsingh, Isaac. (1834).  Annales des empereurs du Japon (Nihon Ōdai Ichiran).  Paris: Royal Asiatic Society, Oriental Translation Fund of Great Britain and Ireland. OCLC 5850691.

Other websites

 Murdoch's map of provinces, 1903

 
Former provinces of Japan
History of Shiga Prefecture